Tina Michelle Langley (born September 3, 1973) is the current head coach of the Washington Huskies women's basketball team. From 2015 to 2021, she was head coach for the Rice Owls women's basketball team.

Head coaching record

References

External links
 Langley's bio at University of Washington

1973 births
Basketball coaches from Alabama
Living people
People from Jasper, Alabama
Rice Owls women's basketball coaches
Washington Huskies women's basketball coaches
University of West Alabama alumni